Vitae is a Latin word, meaning or pertaining to life.

 Aqua vitae, archaic name for a concentrated aqueous solution of ethanol, distilled spirits
 Arbor vitae (disambiguation), "tree of life"
 De Brevitate Vitae, work of Roman philosopher Seneca
 Curriculum vitae or CV, summary of education and job experience, résumé
 Deus Vitae, manga series created by Takuya Fujima
 Evangelium Vitae, encyclical by Pope John Paul II
 Humanae vitae, encyclical by Pope Paul VI
 Liber Vitae, medieval confraternity book
 Lignum vitae, species of plant in the creosote bush family
 Magistra vitae, Latin expression from Cicero's De Oratore, "history is life's teacher"
 Non scholae, sed vitae discimus, Latin phrase, "We do not learn for the school, but for life."
 Sodalitium Christianae Vitae, society of apostolic life founded by Luis Fernando Figari
 Speculum Vitae, Middle English poem possibly by William of Nassyngton
 Vitae duorum Offarum, literary history written in the mid-thirteenth century

Lists of Latin phrases